This is a list of authors from Taiwan.

See also

List of Taiwanese people
Literature of Taiwan
National Museum of Taiwanese Literature
Culture of Taiwan

External links
 Contemporary Authors Full-Text & Image System 當代文學史料影像全文系統  (in Chinese characters)
 Mimesis and Motivation in Taiwan Colonial Fiction
 National Museum of Taiwanese Literature
 On-line Alliance of Taiwan's Modern Poetry 臺灣現代詩網路聯盟 (in Chinese characters)
 Taiwan Fiction in Translation
 Taiwanese Literature (gio.gov.tw)
 Taiwan Literature - English Translation Series (journal)
 Taiwan Xiangtu (Hsiangtu) Wenxue (Taiwan Nativist Literature): the Sojourner-Narrator
UCSB Taiwanese Literature Database

Taiwanese
Writers